Green For All is an organization whose stated goal is to build a green economy while simultaneously lifting citizens out of poverty. It is a DC-based group that brings unions and environmentalists together to push for anti-poverty measures and a clean-energy economy. Green For All was co-founded by Van Jones, former head of the Ella Baker Center for Human Rights and Majora Carter former head of Sustainable South Bronx, and was officially launched in September 2007 at the Clinton Global Initiative.

History 
Green For All was co-founded by Van Jones and Majora Carter after the two had become increasingly concerned with issues of poverty and crime, as well as the lack of a solid infrastructure for "green" jobs. Rather than approach each issue separately, Jones decided to combine the two in a more unified vision and business model. The organization launched in September 2007 at the Clinton Global Initiative, when Jones appeared to announce Green for All's commitment to securing one billion dollars by 2012 to create "green pathways out of poverty" for 250,000 people in the United States. Jones also added that the Ella Baker Center would continue to run a "Green-Collar Jobs Campaign" regionally and statewide in California.

A major component of the Green For All movement is job security:

You can't take a building you want to weatherize, put it on a ship to China and then have them do it and send it back. So we are going to have to put people to work in this country — weatherizing millions of buildings, putting up solar panels, constructing wind farms. Those green-collar jobs can provide a pathway out of poverty for someone who has not gone to college.

According to a March 26, 2008, press release from United Press International (UPI), the green-collar job sector is growing in the United States, and could include more than 14 million workers by 2017. Although it is difficult to pin down what constitutes a green-collar job, the American Solar Energy Society said there are around 8.5 million U.S. jobs that involve Earth-friendly enterprises and renewable energy sources. This figure could grow by 5 million in the next 10 years according to Jerome Ringo of the Apollo Alliance.

Green For All and other green-energy businesses have been receiving increased press by major publications such as the New York Times, USA Today, Business Week and The Nation, indicating that the growth potential cited by UPI is picking up steam in the public sector as well.

In an interview on CNN on April 21, 2016, hours after the musician Prince's death, Van Jones revealed on CNN that Prince had secretly contributed to the funding of Green for All.

In January 2020, Green for All, along with other environmental organizations, groups and individuals, urged a Boston-area transit agency to transition into electric buses and commit to only deploying electric buses by 2030.

References

External links

Environmental organizations based in Washington, D.C.
2007 establishments in the United States
Green politics